Lucas Telly Diallo (born 13 July 1996) is a Burkinabé judoka who competes in the under 73 kg category.

Selected to compete for Burkina Faso at the delayed 2020 Summer Games in Tokyo. He was drawn in his first match against Cedric Bessi of Monaco.

References

1996 births
Living people
Citizens of Burkina Faso through descent
Burkinabé male judoka
Olympic judoka of Burkina Faso
Judoka at the 2020 Summer Olympics
21st-century Burkinabé people
Sportspeople from Paris
French male judoka
Black French sportspeople
French sportspeople of Burkinabé descent
Sportspeople of Burkinabé descent